Verconia laboutei is a species of colourful sea slug, a dorid nudibranch, a shell-less marine gastropod mollusk in the family Chromodorididae.

References

 Gosliner, T.M., Behrens, D.W. & Valdés, Á. (2008) Indo-Pacific Nudibranchs and seaslugs. A field guide to the world's most diverse fauna. Sea Challengers Natural History Books, Washington, 426 pp.

Chromodorididae
Gastropods described in 1986